Neoneura aaroni, the coral-fronted threadtail, is a species of threadtail in the family of damselflies known as Protoneuridae. It is found in Central America and North America.

The IUCN conservation status of Neoneura aaroni is "LC", least concern, with no immediate threat to the species' survival. The population is stable.

References

Further reading

 

Protoneuridae
Articles created by Qbugbot
Insects described in 1903